Ronit Gajanan More (born 2 February 1992) is an Indian first-class cricketer who plays for Karnataka i He is a right-arm medium-fast bowler. He is a member of the Chennai Super Kings squad since 2013 and debuted in the IPL against Kolkata Knight Riders at the Eden Gardens on 30 April 2015.

Early life
Ronit did his schooling from Gomatesh High School, Belgaum and his pre university from Gogte College and now is completing his bachelor's in business from Jain College.

Career
Ronit has also represented Karnataka in the domestic T20 tournament. He was the leading wicket-taker for Karnataka in the group-stage of the 2018–19 Ranji Trophy, with 29 dismissals in six matches.

In August 2019, he was named in the India Red team's squad for the 2019–20 Duleep Trophy.

References

External links

Living people
1992 births
Indian cricketers
Karnataka cricketers
People from Belgaum
Chennai Super Kings cricketers
Cricketers from Karnataka